Hyllos may refer to:
 Hyllus (river), a river in Asia Minor
 Hyllus (spider), a genus of jumping spiders
 In Greek mythology, Hyllus (Ὕλλος), the son of Heracles and Deianira, husband of Iole